The Foxy Hunter is a 1937 Fleischer Studios animated short film starring Betty Boop, her nephew Junior and Pudgy the Puppy. All three characters are voiced by Mae Questel.

Synopsis
Junior and Pudgy slip away from Betty Boop's care to go hunting with a pop-gun. The small woodland creatures don't take kindly to this and beat them up. They high tail it back to Betty Boop's house. A mother duck follows them in and Betty holds them down as the duck spanks them.

References

External links
 The Foxy Hunter on Youtube
 
 

1937 films
Betty Boop cartoons
1930s American animated films
American black-and-white films
1937 animated films
Paramount Pictures short films
Fleischer Studios short films
Short films directed by Dave Fleischer
Animated films about dogs